Donald MacRae Browning (1860 – April 24, 1914) was a Canadian lawyer and politician in Newfoundland Colony. He represented Twillingate in the Newfoundland House of Assembly from 1897 to 1899 as a Liberal.

The son of Gilbert Browning, he was born in St. John's. He attended classes at Upper Canada College and at the University of Glasgow. Browning was called to the Newfoundland bar in 1888. He ran unsuccessfully for the Harbour Grace seat in the Newfoundland assembly in 1893. From 1894 to 1897, Browning served as solicitor for the assembly. He resigned his seat in the assembly in 1899 to become registrar for the Supreme Court of Newfoundland and Registrar of Deeds. He was also named King's Counsel in 1899.

With Sir Edward Morris, he was co-editor of the Law Reports from 1899 to 1903.

References 

Members of the Newfoundland and Labrador House of Assembly
Politicians from St. John's, Newfoundland and Labrador
1860 births
1914 deaths
19th-century King's Counsel
Newfoundland Colony people